Newberry Plaza is a  full amenity luxury skyscraper located in the affluent Gold Coast neighborhood of Chicago, Illinois. It was named after the Newberry Library that once operated at its location. The complex was completed in 1974 and has 57 floors above ground. Gordon and Levin designed the building, which is the 56th tallest in Chicago. When Newberry Plaza was completed it was the sixth-tallest all-residential skyscraper in the world and the first highrise in the city to have townhomes built on top of a building's pedestal, known as the Skyhomes. The property also contains commercial space under the condominium tower (1050 N State). Former famous businesses include the original location of Morton's The Steakhouse, the opulent restaurant Arnie's, exclusive nightclub Zorine's, both also owned by the Morton family, the Grotto, and Trader Vic's. In addition to its astonishing views of the city, it might be best known for its prominent location as the only residential high-rise building in a well known triangle of high end restaurants on the East and Oak Street on the South.

See also
List of tallest buildings in Chicago

References

Skyscraper office buildings in Chicago
Buildings and structures completed in 1974
Residential skyscrapers in Chicago
1974 establishments in Illinois

External links
 Newberry Plaza Website
 Newberry Plaza Resident Website